Dennis van Niekerk (born 19 October 1984 in Kroonstad) is a South African cyclist.

Major results
2009
 3rd Giro del Capo III
2013
 1st Stage 5 Tour de Korea (TTT)

References

External links
 
 
 

1984 births
Living people
South African male cyclists